Yechiel (Eli) Shainblum שיינבלום, יחיאל, also Sheinblum, was a Canadian painter, sculptor and teacher from Montreal. Though he was a respected and prolific artist who produced literally hundreds of pieces beginning in the 1920s and on through the early 1980s, Shainblum was much better known in Montreal as an elementary school teacher. His family reports that Shainblum derived great joy from teaching, and he put much more emphasis on pedagogy and his students than he did on promoting his artistic career.

Shainblum taught art, Yiddish and Hebrew (among other subjects) to five generations of Jewish children in several different Jewish day schools in Montreal, including the United Talmud Torahs of Montreal and the Jewish People's Schools and Peretz Schools. He was often recognized on the street by former students, many of whom had grown up to become prominent figures in business, the arts, medicine and science.

It is likely that Shainblum would be better known nationally and internationally if his work had been more widely seen during his lifetime. He had few (if any) major exhibitions, and he mostly distributed his paintings and sculptures among family and friends rather than selling them to museums and art galleries. He did combine his two major interests by illustrating several children's books over the years, many—though not all—in Yiddish and Hebrew. He died in 1987.

Works (excerpt)
 plein air artist at work 19 ½” x 16” 
 Vintage Jap. rev. ptg. on glass of Geisha girls 13” x 19”
 Book-Cover: designed by Yechiel Shainblum, 1972. Montreal, Jewish School Publishing House, 1969 (52 pages)
 Meged, A.: Khane Senesh. Edited by S. Rubinstein, translated by M. H., illustrated by Yechiel Shainblum

External links
 Sheinblum at Yiddish book center
 Featuring: Chaim Spilberg, Chava Talenberg, Paul Trepman, Babey Trepman, Mordecai Husid, Abe Igelfeld, Rokhl Korn, Yechiel Sheinblum. This event took place on November 3, 1969. "Mordecai Husid evening" in honor of his book "Generations Screaming Over Me"
 di bobetse mit dieyniklekh . A bear-story, illustr. Shainblum די באבעצע מיט די אייניקלעך
 illustr. Shainblum; Ḥayim Naḥman Bialiḳ; Simon, Solomon, 1895-; Ḥosid, M. (Mordekhai), 1909-

Further reading
 Journals of Yaakov Zipper, 1950-1982: The Struggle for Yiddishkeit
 Gennadiĭ Ėstraĭkh, Mikhail Krutikov, Kerstin Hoge: Children and Yiddish literature. From early modernity to post-modernity. Legenda, Cambridge, Modern Humanities Research Association, Abingdon, Oxon; New York, NY, Routledge 2016 (This collection of articles grew out of the 2013 Mendel Friedman conference on this topic at the University of Oxford. Includes bibliographical references and index.)

References 

20th-century Canadian painters
Canadian male painters
Artists from Montreal
Canadian sculptors
Jewish Canadian artists
Jewish painters
Jewish sculptors
1987 deaths
Year of birth missing
20th-century sculptors
Yiddish-speaking people
20th-century Canadian male artists